Diego Gastón López Barrios (born 23 February 1994) is a Uruguayan footballer who plays as a midfielder for Deportivo Llacuabamba.

Career
López featured for the youth of Peñarol and River Plate. In July 2014, López went to Maltese football for a trial with Msida Saint-Joseph. Two months later, López completed a move to join Selargius in Italy's Serie D. López signed for Sud América of the Uruguayan Primera División in 2015. He made his professional bow on 24 May during a win at the Jardines del Hipódromo Stadium over Danubio. His stint lasted three seasons, with him playing five matches. On 16 May 2017, López joined Peruvian Segunda División side Sport Victoria. Seven appearances followed, along with the midfielder's first goal on 15 July versus Los Caimanes.

February 2018 saw López remain in the Peruvian second tier by agreeing to join Unión Huaral. His first appearance came two months after during a 1–2 win away to Deportivo Coopsol, which was one of four matches for them as they were eliminated in the play-off quarter-finals to Juan Aurich.

Career statistics
.

References

External links

1994 births
Living people
People from Trinidad, Uruguay
Uruguayan footballers
Association football midfielders
Uruguayan expatriate footballers
Expatriate footballers in Italy
Expatriate footballers in Peru
Uruguayan expatriate sportspeople in Italy
Uruguayan expatriate sportspeople in Peru
Uruguayan Primera División players
Peruvian Segunda División players
A.S.D. Selargius Calcio players
Sud América players
Sport Victoria players
Unión Huaral footballers